Cardinal Newman can refer to: 

 John Henry Newman, an Anglican and later Roman Catholic theologian and cardinal.

Roman Catholic educational institutions named after the theologian include:

 Schools
 Cardinal Newman Catholic School, England
 Blessed Cardinal Newman Catholic High School, Toronto, Ontario
 Cardinal Newman Catholic High School (Warrington), England
 Cardinal Newman Catholic School and Community College, Coventry, England
 Cardinal Newman Catholic School (Hove), England
 Cardinal Newman College, Preston, Lancashire, England
 Cardinal Newman High School (Santa Rosa, California)
 Cardinal Newman High School (West Palm Beach, Florida)
 Cardinal Newman High School (Columbia, South Carolina)
 Cardinal Newman High School, Bellshill, Scotland
 Cardinal Newman Secondary School, Hamilton, Ontario
 Cardinal Newman Roman Catholic Comprehensive, Rhydyfelin, Wales
 The John Henry Newman School, Stevenage, England
 Newman Catholic High School (disambiguation)

 Universities
Newman University (disambiguation)